The Santiago Marathon  is an annual event first run in 2007 through the streets of Santiago Chile. Other races include a half marathon and a 10K run.

The marathon held the IAAF Road Race Bronze Label in 2014, 2015 and 2017.

Route
The race starts and finishes in the Plaza de la Ciudadanía, opposite the Palacio de la Moneda.

Results
Race record in bold

See also

 List of marathon races in South America
 Sport in Chile

References

External links
 Official Santiago Marathon Web Site
 FEDACHI Web Site

Marathons in Chile
Sport in Santiago
Recurring sporting events established in 2007
Annual sporting events in Chile
2007 establishments in Chile
Autumn events in Chile